Leederville railway station is a railway station on the Transperth network in Western Australia. It is located on the Joondalup line, 3.2 kilometres from Perth station serving the suburb of Leederville.

History 
Leederville station opened on 20 December 1992 in the median strip of the Mitchell Freeway.

In 2003, the contract for extending the platforms on seven Joondalup line stations, including Leederville station, was awarded to Lakis Constructions. Along with the extensions, the platform edges were upgraded to bring them into line with tactile paving standards. Leederville was the first station to begin being extended. Work at this station was completed by April 2004.

In 2012 a double-ended turnback siding was opened between the tracks at the city side of the station, constructed as part of a $19.8m program to improve the resilience of the Transperth network during disruptions.

Services
Leederville station is served by Transperth Joondalup line services. 

Leederville station saw 937,581 passengers in the 2013–14 financial year.

Platforms

Platforms currently in use are as follows:

Bus routes

References

External links

Joondalup line
Leederville, Western Australia
Railway stations in Perth, Western Australia
Railway stations in Australia opened in 1992
Transperth railway stations in highway medians